Henkäys Ikuisuudesta (officially translated as: Breath From Heaven) is the first solo album by Finnish singer Tarja Turunen, and focuses on the Christmas holiday season. On November 26, 2010, Nuclear Blast released a re-mastered version of the CD, bringing a new artwork and a semi-new track list, with "Heinillä Härkien" replacing "Happy New Year" and "Maa On Niin Kaunis" replacing "Happy Christmas (War Is Over)"; the new edition also contains the previously unpublished track "Arkihuolesi Kaikki Heitä", which replaced "The Eyes of a Child".

Background
All of the tracks are covers, except for "Kuin Henkäys Ikuisuutta" which was written by Tarja and Esa Nieminen. "En Etsi Valtaa, Loistoa" was released on Tarja's "Yhden Enkelin Unelma" single in 2004, but the vocals have been re-recorded for this album. The music is composed by Jean Sibelius and the lyrics by Zacharias Topelius; Tarja also released "Walking in the Air" when she was a member of Nightwish, on their 1998 album Oceanborn. "Marian Poika" is the Finnish version of "Mary's Boy Child" and "Jouluyö, Juhlayö" is "Silent Night". The ABBA cover "Happy New Year" consists of both English and Spanish lyrics. The first single of the album, "You Would Have Loved This", was released in Finland on October 25.

Sales performance
The album reached Gold and Platinum status in Finland with more than 50,000 sold copies, and charted as N° 2 on the official Finnish Albums Chart.

Track listing

Sales and certifications

Personnel

Credits for Henkäys Ikuisuudesta adapted from liner notes.

Musicians
Tarja Turunen - Lead vocals
Maria Ilmoniemi & Esa Nieminen - Keyboards and piano
Juha Lanu - Electric and acoustic guitar
Ako Kiiski - Bass guitar
Harri Ala-Kojola - Drums
Iiris Pyrhönen, Heikki Hämäläinen - Violin
Tiia Makkonen & Veli-Matti Iljin - Cello
Mauri Pietikäinen - Viola
Emilia Kauppinen - Flute
Heikki Pohto - Saxophone

Main crew
Esa Nieminen - Music arrangements
Mika Jussila - Mastering engineer
Travis Smith - Cover artwork
Toni Härkönen - Photography

References

External links
Tarja's Official Website

Tarja Turunen albums
2006 Christmas albums
Christmas albums by Finnish artists
2006 debut albums